"The Favourite" is a song by Australian acid jazz band, D.I.G. and released in February 1994 as the lead single from the band's debut studio album Dig Deeper. The song peaked at number 63 on the Australian ARIA Charts.

At the ARIA Music Awards of 1995, the song was nominated for ARIA Award for Breakthrough Artist – Single.

Track listing
CD single (D11611)
 "The Favourite" (radio edit) - 4:20
 "Klunky" (live) - 6:56
 "The Favourite" (live) - 11:18

Charts

References

1993 songs
1994 singles